Ilkka Heilä (1956 in Ekenäs) is a Finnish cartoonist who lives in Kaarina. He draws B. Virtanen -comic strip. Comics by Heilä appeared as early as in the beginning of 1970s in the comic magazine Sarjis. However, working in a post office replaced professional self-fulfillment of artistic tendencies the nearly 20 years period, until then he created Bulls-syndicate of his comic strip B. Virtanen and took part in comic competition arranged by newspaper Uusi Suomi in 1989. Thanks to this comic strip, Heilä could at last in the 1990s move to a full-time comic artist. He got the Puupäähattu, a valued Finnish comic prize of Suomen Sarjakuvaseura (Finnish Comic Club) in year 2006.

References

1956 births
Living people
People from Raseborg
Finnish comic strip cartoonists
Finnish comics artists